Graham Peter Clarke (born July 11, 1970) is an American musician, songwriter, arranger, and entertainer. Active since 1995 and performing frequently in the New York metropolitan area, Clarke is regarded as one of New York's most popular and long-lasting children's entertainers and recording artists having played well over 5,000 musical performances on the east coast for both children and adults. His style has been described as funny and "off-center". He has yet to sign to any label and continues to self-publish his music.

Biography

1970 to 1988: early years
Graham Clarke was born in Holy Name Medical Center in Teaneck, New Jersey on July 11, 1970.  Clarke's parents, Lorain Maria Clarke (née Meola), a homemaker, and Thomas Michael "Moose" Clarke, a stockbroker were married in 1960 and had three children before Graham: Thomas in 1961, Dennis in 1962, and Martin in 1965.  He spent the first seven years of his life in a split-level home in Dumont, New Jersey.  He was frequently in the room when his older brother Tommy would have guitar lessons with musician Bob Berger.  Bob noted one time when a screaming Graham had scarlet fever "That boy's screaming on key!  That's a C note."  Such exposure to music had an obvious influence on him and there is an oft-told family story that claims the first song Graham ever learned to sing was "Me and Julio Down by the Schoolyard," a popular song Tommy was learning on the guitar at the time.  At the age of seven, his family moved one town over to Oradell, where he attended St. Joseph Grammar School, and later Bergen Catholic High School. Neither school had a music program so Graham taught himself how to play the guitar using his brother's old fake books.

1989 to 1996: Burgeoning musician

Attending Boston College in the fall of 1988, Clarke accepted an invitation into the school's undergraduate Honors Program.  In addition to performing solo at bars, clubs and street performances at subway stations (without a license), he also acted at the Robsham Theater and wrote original sketch comedy for the campus coffeehouse.  He also traveled with conductor Alexander Peloquin and the Boston College Chorale, singing as a bass, baritone, and tenor.  In 1991 Graham met his future wife, Peggy Clarke (née Amlung), who was a graduate student in the BC theology department.

After graduation in 1992, Clarke moved to New Rochelle in the affluent Westchester suburbs of New York City.  In September he took a job working as an English teacher at Evander Childs High School in the Bronx.  In 1994, he left teaching and entered the philosophy PhD program at Fordham University, a move that would dramatically influence his future work.  In an effort to help his sister-in-law, Janine, in 1995 Clarke began caring part-time for Janine's son, Blake.  Noticing how much Blake enjoyed it when he brought over his guitar, Janine, herself a teacher, suggested that he go to the local nursery schools daycare centers to see if they needed a music specialist.  She gave him some Raffi cassettes and other children's music she used in the classroom.  By the end of 1996, Clarke had more work than he could handle.  He was making weekly visits to over 20 schools and daycare centers and was being rapidly invited to play at many events  and parties throughout Westchester and Rockland Counties. From 1999 onward, he was the gold standard for children's party entertainment in Westchester  having worked for such New York families as the Trumps and the Tisches. Soon, the majority of his work was coming from the high-end bedroom communities of Greenwich, Bedford, New Canaan, and Scarsdale.  In 1996, he had surgery on his sinuses to be able to manage his heavy workload (singing four hours a day, five days a week.)

1997 to present: recording artist

Graham & Delores
In 1996 Clarke approached John Reynolds, whom he knew from his brother Marty's late-1980s band The Goatmen, to help him make his first album, Graham & Delores. Recorded at Arrigoni Center, a former Episcopal church, at Iona College on a TASCAM 4-track portastudio (borrowed from noted Thomas Merton scholar Kathleen Deignan), the album featured a very basic, live acoustic sound featuring only Clarke and his guitar with no over-dubbing. It was released in 1997 selling out the original run of over 1000 units strictly at his local shows by 1998.

Graham & Cinnamon
Branching out in 1999, Clarke followed up with a second album Graham & Cinnamon which featured a much more studio produced sound.  Again, he went to John Reynolds for production assistance.  Reynolds brought him to the (now defunct) Nu Bleu Recording Studio in Garfield, NJ run by Andy Halasz.  The instrumentation expanded well beyond Clarke and his guitar.  Reynolds contributed invaluably to this album by providing arrangements and playing every instrument on the album besides Graham's guitar.  Songs like "If I Live to Be 100" and "Grandma Can You Jump?" benefitted greatly from Reynolds instrumentation (including playing the drums, which Reynods had never played before) and the recording experience he brought with him from The Goatmen and Every Damn Day.  Clarke started to receive airplay on local radio stations, premiering on WPLJ's "Scott and Todd: The Big Show".

American Blue
Released in June 2001, American Blue again saw Clarke moving further out of his one-man-one-guitar recordings.  This time he brought on his brother Tommy Clarke to help produce.  They recorded over a weekend at the studio of Jazz-o-lution bassist's Marshall Topo, with whom he had worked for Carla Henderson's "Your Tiny" videos) in Port Chester, NY.  The album's crown jewel, "Fancy Pants", is a paean to one of Clarke's musical heroes, David Bowie.  But many of Clarke's songs are clearly the product by his local work with groups of children in the Lower Hudson Valley region of New York and Clarke has said at his live shows that "Jack, Jack, Jackson and Jason" are four actual boys from one of his music classes.  Always assuming intelligence on the part of the child, Clarke arranged a version of the Christmas carol 'We Three Kings" incorporated elements from Mozart's Requiem Mass, especially the vocal portion of "Lacrimosa dies illa".  American Blue also featured Clarke's first a cappella recording, a reworking of the Georgia Sea Island folksong "Old Lady Come from Brewster" using only his voice for the "instruments".  The album's "Sword and Shield" is noted on the back cover as "for Peg", apparently a dedication to his wife.

Acoustic New York
After the September 11 attacks in 2001, Clarke again called on his brother Tommy to help produce an album devoted entirely to New York.  Recorded at Tommy's home in Cambridge, Acoustic New York was released on the one-year anniversary of the 9-11 attacks.  After seeing Ric Burns' New York: A Documentary Film, Clarke was apparently  inspired and wrote the majority of both "Dig Dig Dig (The Croton Aqueduct Song)" and "Elisha Graves Otis (The Elevator Song)" in the next 24 hours.  Tommy again accompanies him on many of the album's tracks, including Clarke's reworking of "My Country, 'Tis of Thee".  In another nod to his local work, the hyperbolic "Sue Speigel's Driveway" is apparently based on an actual event at an Armonk music class.  Clarke has never performed the dolorous "Angel Parade" in public.

FiVE
In 2004, Clarke released what was to be his most popular and best-selling album to date, FiVE.  (The title refers to it being Clarke's fifth album and is not a reference to The Dave Clark Five.)  Tommy Clarke once again took over producing and mixing duties and the album was recorded in Clarke's library in Somers.  According to the liner notes, domestic activity at the household continued through, sometimes during, the recordings leading to some unintentional musical artifacts like the sounds of a dishwasher being loaded during "My Old Kentucky Home".  "King George the Monkey" was the most popular song on the album and is arguably the most well-crafted song of his career.  The album also includes songs Clarke had written for his aborted television pilot ("Supermarket," "Learn to Read," "Graham Clarke Show," and "The Oui Song").  Alto Amy Healey joined Clarke for duets on both "Come on Up Athena" and "Leaning on the Everlasting Arms" (a song Clarke performed at Healy's wedding two years previous).  By 2008, Clarke's complete catalog of songs were picked up by iTunes, Amazon MP3, Rhapsody and other online distributors.

Controversy
FiVE's "King George the Monkey" came under considerable scrutiny by political conservatives and liberals alike as being a thinly veiled reference to then-President George W. Bush's foreign policy, a claim Clarke has not publicly confirmed nor denied.  Bush's approval ratings were riding above 50% when the album was released.

Hogging the Covers
Released in May 2012, Clarke returned with his first album in 7 years.  The album reportedly will feature only Clarke and his guitar and will be a compilation of original cover arrangements of rock, pop, and jazz songs featuring songs by The Beatles, The Police, Nirvana, Iron and Wine, and others (pending the securing of rights).  Principle recording was completed in September 2008.  The title refers not only to the cover arrangements, but also because it is intended to be an album of  lullabies.

Television and video
It was during the production of American Blue that Clarke started to branch into children's video.  He made the "Quills Up!" video for the American Association of Poison Control Centers with producer Jonathan Katz and provided music for the "Your Tiny" series of videos produced by Carla Henderson for Child Smart.  Clarke also looked into landing his own children's television show.  After being approached by a television network executive mother and an inspiring meeting with Sesame Street's Gordon, Clarke began work on a TV pilot with actor-writer Brian Reid
.  But the experience was cut short by sour experiences with personalities in the television industry and by the economic aftermath following the September 11 attacks.

Clarke has been a frequent guest on News 12 and other local TV stations.  He often appears during special holiday segments, often appearing and singing with children.

MADtv parody
In 2001, not long after the release of Acoustic New York, the sketch comedy television show MADtv first aired a comedy skit called "Sundays with Graham Clark" which portrayed a children's entertainer (dressed like and singing like Clarke) singing songs promoting atheism, though Clarke himself has never written children's songs about or publicly advocating atheism.

Charity work
Clarke has done benefits for many charities including the 2004 tsunami victims  and Widows of 9-11.  He enjoyed a 15-month-long weekly performance at Blythedale Children's Hospital.  Clarke also donates performances annually to The Red Cross, Kids in Crisis, multiple Junior Leagues, as well as many local charities, schools, and libraries.

Guitars
Clarke plays Ovation guitars almost exclusively.  He owns four:  "Delores", "Cinnamon", "Bluebell", and "Blondie".  He was given a 1986 Collector's Edition by his brother Tommy.  Although he records with it (reportedly Hogging the Covers was performed entirely with it), Graham rarely plays it in public.

Personal life
Graham has been married to his wife Peggy since May 28, 1994.  Peggy is currently senior minister at Community Church of New York. They live in Somers, New York.  They have a child, Zachary. Clarke was raised Roman Catholic, but left the faith by his time at Boston College.  Though technically not a member, he does frequently attend services and perform at the Unitarian Universalists. He also sees his family frequently and all four brothers make an annual trip to a different city to watch a live professional hockey game.  He is a dog lover and has owned dogs his entire adult life, often including them in his songs ("Come on Up, Athena", "Man in the Moon").

He is a resident of Somers, New York.

Relatives
Clarke is first cousin to Grammy Award-winning, Oscar-nominated film score composer Alan Silvestri.

Discography 
Graham & Delores (1997)
Graham & Cinnamon (1999)
American Blue (2001)
Acoustic New York (2003)
Five (2005)
Hoggin' the Covers (2012)

References

External links
Official Graham Clarke web page

American children's musicians
American comedy musicians
American baritones
Living people
1970 births
Boston College alumni
Fordham University alumni
People from Dumont, New Jersey
People from Oradell, New Jersey
Musicians from New Rochelle, New York
People from Somers, New York
Singer-songwriters from New Jersey
Singer-songwriters from New York (state)
Comedians from New York (state)
Guitarists from New Jersey
American male guitarists
21st-century American singers
21st-century American comedians
21st-century American guitarists
21st-century American male singers
American male singer-songwriters